James Denny (born 20 September 1993) is a British diver from Leeds who specialises in events from the 10 m platform.

Career

Denny started diving in 2005. His first achievements at international level came with the 2011 Junior European Championships where he classified 4th from the 1 m springboard and 6th from the 10 m platform. During the period 2011-2014 he competed at the British Championships, where he collected several medals.

He represented England at the 2014 Commonwealth Games, winning a silver medal alongside his partner Tom Daley in the 10 m platform synchro, and classifying 6th in the individual event. Also during the same year, he took part in the 2014 European Aquatics Championships, where he missed on a bronze medal in the 10 m synchro event alongside Tom Daley and achieved a 12th place in the individual final.

Results

Senior Results

References

External links
 James Denny at the City of Leeds Diving Club
 
 
 

1993 births
Living people
English male divers
Divers at the 2014 Commonwealth Games
Sportspeople from Leeds
People educated at Garforth Academy
Commonwealth Games silver medallists for England
Commonwealth Games medallists in diving
Medallists at the 2014 Commonwealth Games